Casas de Pedro Barba, or simply Pedro Barba, is a small community of summer residences on the island of La Graciosa, Canary Islands, Spain. Its population, as of 1 January 2018 and according to the Spanish Statistical Institute, is of 3 inhabitants. It is part of the municipality of Teguise on the neighbouring island of Lanzarote. There are no asphalted roads on La Graciosa; a dirt track connects the settlement to the only other inhabited town on the island, Caleta de Sebo, from which a regular ferry service is offered to Lanzarote.

References

Graciosa, Canary Islands
Populated places in the Canary Islands